Bosilegrad is a town and municipality located in the Pčinja District of southern Serbia. According to 2011 census, town has a population of 2,624 inhabitants, while the municipality has 8,129 inhabitants.

Along with Dimitrovgrad (Tsaribrod), Bosilegrad is an economic and cultural centre of Serbia's ethnic Bulgarian community.

History

Historically, Bosilegrad was part of Bulgaria. On May 15, 1917, Serbian paramilitaries (Chetniks) under the command of Kosta Pećanac crossed the old Bulgarian border and, as part of the Toplica Uprising, they captured Bosilegrad, which they then burned. Then Pećanac and his band withdrew to Kosovo, which was controlled by the Austro-Hungarian Army.

The Kingdom of Serbs, Croats and Slovenes gained some territory from Bulgaria as part of the Treaty of Neuilly-sur-Seine, following the invasion and occupation of part of the Kingdom of Serbia by Bulgaria and subsequent Allied defeat of the Central Powers in the First World War. From 1929 to 1941, it was part of Vardar Banovina. The Bulgarian army occupied Bosilegrad during the Second World War from 1941 to 1944. At the end of the Second World War, Bulgaria switched the sides in the war and in October 1944 gave the occupied Western outlands back to Yugoslavia.

Settlements

Aside from the town of Bosilegrad, the municipality consists of the following villages:

Demographics

According to the 2011 census, the municipality of Bosilegrad has a population of 8,129 inhabitants. Only 32.28% of inhabitants live in urban areas.

Ethnic groups
The majority of municipality's population are Bulgarians, amounting to over 70% of total population. Other minor ethnic groups are Serbs and Roma people. The ethnic composition of the municipality:

Gallery

See also
 Tsaribrod
 Western Outlands

References

External links

 Official website

Populated places in Pčinja District
Municipalities and cities of Southern and Eastern Serbia
Bulgarian communities in Serbia
Serbian war crimes
World War I crimes by the Allies